Charles' or Charlie Owen may refer to:

 Charles Owen (pianist) (born 1971), British classical pianist
 Charles Lewis Owen (1852–1926), American-born manufacturer and political figure in Ontario, Canada
 Charles Mansfield Owen (1852–1940), Anglican priest 
 Charlie Owen (footballer), Australian rules footballer
 Charlie Owen (musician), Australian multi-instrumentalist and producer